Radana is female given name. Diminutive of Slavic names beginning with rad joy. Feminine version of Radan or Radovan.  It means bringing joy or joyful. The origin of the name is connected to Latin names Hilarius, Hilaria (hilaris joyful). Similar names are Radka, Radovana, Radmila, Radomíra, Radoslava. Pronounced rah-dah-nah.

Name Days 
Czech: 15 December

Famous bearers 
Radana Königová, professor of medicine renowned for her lifelong contribution in burn care and burn care research
Radana Labajová, Czech popular singer
Radana Kynosová, Czech model
Radana Vojtová, Czech actress

External links 
Radana -> Behind the Name

References 
Miloslava Knappová

Czech feminine given names